The first leadership election was held in the TOP 09 party in the Czech Republic on 28 November 2009. Karel Schwarzenberg became party's leader.

Background
During  2009, Miroslav Kalousek left Christian and Democratic Union – Czechoslovak People's Party and decided to form a new party called TOP 09 He managed to attract some personas from other parties. It included Senator Karel Schwarzenberg who was speculated to be a possible candidate for party's leader.

Results
Party's assembly was held on 28 November 2009. Schwarzenberg was introduced as the only candidate for the leader of TOP 09. 164 delegates were allowed to vote, including Schwarzenberg. Schwarzenberg refused to vote in the election and received 163 votes. Schwarzenberg became icon of the party and many delegates looked up to him with much admiration.

References

TOP 09 leadership elections
TOP 09 leadership election
Single-candidate elections
TOP 09 leadership election
TOP 09 leadership election